Function or functionality may refer to:

Computing 
 Function key, a type of key on computer keyboards
 Function model, a structured representation of processes in a system
 Function object or functor or functionoid, a concept of object-oriented programming
 Function (computer programming), or subroutine, a sequence of instructions within a larger computer program

Music 
 Function (music), a relationship of a chord to a tonal centre
 Function (musician) (born 1973), David Charles Sumner, American techno DJ and producer
 "Function" (song), a 2012 song by American rapper E-40 featuring YG, Iamsu! & Problem
 "Function", song by Dana Kletter from Boneyard Beach 1995

Other uses 
 Function (biology), the effect of an activity or process
 Function (engineering), a specific action that a system can perform
 Function (language), a way of achieving an aim using language
 Function (mathematics), a relation that associates an input to a single output
 Function (sociology), an activity's role in society
 Functionality (chemistry), the presence of functional groups in a molecule
 Party or function, a social event
 Function Drinks, an American beverage company

See also 
 Function field (disambiguation)
 Function hall
 Functional (disambiguation)
 Functional group (disambiguation)
 Functionalism (disambiguation)
 Functor (disambiguation)